Sambuddhatva jayanthi, also known as Sambuddha jayanthi, is a religious festival in relation with the Vesak. In the Buddhist world it is celebrated in several Theravada countries including Sri Lanka, India and in Buddhist communities of other countries. Buddha's Enlightenment is highlighted and teachings of Buddha preserved in Pāli Canon become more popular in this period among Buddhists who follow the Theravada.

External links
Sambuddhatva jayanthi, Anniversary of Buddha`s Enlightenment
Sri Sambuddha Jayanthi Mandiraya
Globalpagoda.org: Official Site
Mahamevnawa.lk

Buddhist festivals in Sri Lanka
Buddhist festivals in India
Buddhist festivals in Nepal